is a train station on the Echigo Line in Nishi-ku, Niigata, Niigata Prefecture, Japan, operated by East Japan Railway Company (JR East).

Lines
Niigata University Station is served by the Echigo Line, and is 72.3 kilometers from the starting point of the line at Kashiwazaki Station.

Layout
The station consists of one ground-level side platform serving a single bi-directional track.

Suica farecard can be used at this station.

History 
The station opened on 8 April 1984. With the privatization of Japanese National Railways (JNR) on 1 April 1987, the station came under the control of JR East. In 2017 the English station name was changed from "Niigatadaigakumae" to the current "Niigata University".

Passenger statistics
In fiscal 2017, the station was used by an average of 3011 passengers daily (boarding passengers only).

Surrounding area
 Niigata University

See also
 List of railway stations in Japan

References

External links

  

Railway stations in Niigata (city)
Railway stations in Japan opened in 1984
Stations of East Japan Railway Company
Echigo Line